The Old Main Post Office in Athens, Alabama, also known as Washington Street Courthouse Annex, was built in 1933.  Located one block from the Courthouse Square, the Neoclassical building was constructed by the Works Progress Administration.  The front is divided by 8 Doric columns.  Granite stairs flanked by original cast iron lamps lead to 3 sets of doors in the center bays.  The lobby features marble floors, wainscoting, pilasters, and door trim.

The post office was converted to a courthouse annex in 1979. It was listed on the National Register of Historic Places in 1982.

See also 
List of United States post offices

References 

Neoclassical architecture in Alabama
Government buildings completed in 1933
National Register of Historic Places in Limestone County, Alabama
Post office buildings on the National Register of Historic Places in Alabama
Works Progress Administration in Alabama
Historic district contributing properties in Alabama